Gangadharrao Soundalyarao "G. S." Maddala (21 May 1933 – 4 June 1999) was an Indian American economist, mathematician, and teacher, known for his contributions in the field of econometrics and for the textbooks he authored in this field.

Biography and education
He was "born in India to a family of very modest means."

He obtained a B.A. in Mathematics from Andhra University and, in 1957, an M.A. in Statistics from Bombay University.

He came to the United States as a Fulbright Scholar to the Economics department of the University of Chicago.

In 1963, he completed his Ph.D. in the Department of Economics at the University of Chicago with a dissertation written under the supervision of Zvi Griliches.

Teaching and research career
Maddala's first faculty position was at Stanford University.

He held the University Eminent Scholar position at Ohio State University upon his death; previous university affiliations included Stanford University (1963–1967), University of Rochester (1967–1975), and the University of Florida (1975–1993).

Maddala published over 110 scholarly papers and wrote 12 books covering most of the emerging areas of econometrics. His 1983 book titled Limited Dependent and Qualitative Variables in Econometrics is now regarded as a classic and seminal text for advanced studies in econometrics.

In econometrics methodology, Maddala’s key areas of research and exposition included distributed lags, generalized least squares, panel data, simultaneous equations, errors in variables, income distribution, switching regressions, disequilibrium models, qualitative and limited dependent variable models, self-selection models, outliers and bootstrap methods, unit roots and cointegration methods, and Bayesian econometrics.  In empirical economics, Maddala contributed to the areas of consumption, production and cost functions, money demand, regulation, pseudo-data, returns to college education, housing market discrimination, survey data on expectations, and risk premia in future markets.

Selected publications
  (1983). Limited Dependent and Qualitative Variables in Econometrics, Cambridge. Description, and preview.
  (1992). Introduction to Econometrics, 2nd ed., Macmillan.

Memorials and tributes
The G. S. Maddala Memorial Fund, at Ohio State University, was created in 2004, by Dr. Maddala's wife Kameswari "Kay" and his colleagues and students. It provides awards "to graduate students for excellence in quantitative research using econometrics, both theoretical and applied" and sponsors distinguished speakers.

References

External links
 G.S. Maddala, "How I Became an Econometrician", autobiographic essay
 Kajal Lahiri and Peter C.B. Phillips (1999), "Obituary: G.S. Maddala, 1939-1999", Econometric Theory 15
 Kajal Lahiri (1999), "The ET Interview: Professor G.S. Maddala", Econometric Theory 15

1933 births
1999 deaths
Econometricians
University of Chicago alumni
Ohio State University faculty
Indian emigrants to the United States
Stanford University Department of Economics faculty
University of Mumbai alumni
University of Florida faculty
20th-century Indian mathematicians
20th-century Indian economists
Andhra University alumni
Fellows of the Econometric Society
American academics of Indian descent
Scientists from Andhra Pradesh
20th-century American economists